Women have played association football since the beginnings of the sport. In a number of countries, however, women's football has historically been subjected to severe restrictions, including outright bans during most of the 20th century. These bans have had a significant impact on the development of the sport.

Background 
Following the outbreak of World War I and the subsequent mass mobilisation of women into the workforce, interest in women's football rose rapidly and many teams and tournaments were founded. The interest in the sport continued to grow following the end of the war and into the 1920s. During this period, which has been referred to as a first golden age for women's football, matches were able to attract significant audiences. However, the end of the war also brought with it a backlash against the gains women's had made, including legal changes to rollback women's employment, such the Restoration of Pre-War Practices Act 1919, and moral panics, such as over the flapper sub-culture.

By country

Belgium 

The Royal Belgian Football Association instituted a ban on women's football in the 1920s, citing medical reasons. The ban would last until late-1970, when the Association announced that men's clubs would be allowed to establish women's sections. However, the Association put in place several restrictions on women's games, including limiting the game to two 35-minutes halves without extra time instead of two 45-minutes halves, making players take corner kicks from the edge of the penalty area instead of the corner area, and limiting the size of the ball to that used by U12 boys players.

Brazil 

By 1940, there was at least 10 women's football clubs in Brazil and the sport was growing, including matches being held at the Pacaembu Stadium. However, campaigners against the sport contacted President Getúlio Vargas, claiming that it posed a threat to the health of potential mothers and would cause a deterioration of social norms. Vargas subsequently ordered the Ministry of Health to investigate the concerns, and in April 1941, issued Decree-law 3,199. The decree banned women from taking part in sports "incompatible with the conditions of their nature," including football. As a result, existing women's teams were forcibly disbanded and attempts to establish new teams were blocked. The ban received support from João Havelange, head of the Brazilian Sports Confederation from 1958 to 1973 and afterwards President of FIFA until 1998. In 1965, following the 1964 Brazilian coup d'état, the military dictatorship in Brazil announced that it would maintain the ban, and the ban subsequently became a target of feminist resistance to the dictatorship. In 1979, the dictatorship lifted the ban. However, new teams and competitions that had been founded after the end of the ban soon encountered significant prejudice, sometimes violent, and by 2001, all the national women's competitions in the country had folded. It would take until 2013 for the Campeonato Brasileiro de Futebol Feminino Série A1 to be established.

Denmark 
Following the 1971 Women's World Cup, in which the unofficial Danish national team were champions, the Danish Football Union (DBU) announced that it would continue to ban women from football. DBU chair Vilhelm Skousen declared that the ban would last as long as he lived, saying that "we cannot and will not take [women's football] seriously." However, the following year, UEFA ruled that national associations had to incorporate women's football, and the Danish ban was lifted. The DBU subsequently disestablished the unofficial competitions and teams the players were forced to sign up to an entirely new system created from scratch. The DBU further instituted a rule that Danish teams could only compete internationally against other officially-recognised teams, limiting the options available to the new official women's teams.

France 

In 1919, the French Football Federation formally declared that it would not admit women, but did not formally ban the sport. In response, the Fédération des sociétés féminines sportives de France (FSFSF), which had been formed in 1917, began to organise women's football competitions. The FSFSF continued to oversee women's football until 1933, when the French Football Federation formally instituted a ban on women's football. Some unofficial competitions would continue until 1941, when the fascist Vichy government made women's football illegal. It would take until March 1970 for the French Football Federation to lift its ban on women's football.

Germany 

In West Germany, the German Football Association (DFB) imposed a ban on women's football in 1955. To justify the ban, the DFB claimed that the roughness of the sport would damage women's fertility and health as well as representing an even inappropriate for public viewing, saying that "in the fight for the ball, female grace disappears, body and soul are inevitably damaged, and the public parading of the body is offensive and indecent." The ban was met with resistance, particularly following the advent of the West German student movement in the late-1960s, but attempts to organise matches were often broken up by police. The ban was lifted on 31 October 1970, as the DFB concluded that if it did not take control of and institutionalise the sport within the DFB then, there was a growing risk that it might never be able to. Following the end of the ban, the DFB initially imposed a number of restrictions on women's matches, including limiting the playing time to two 30-minute halves, only allowing matches to be organised during warm weather, disallowing the use of studs on football boots, and disallowing the display of sponsorships on football shirts. It would take until 1982 for the DFB to form West Germany women's national football team.

In East Germany, the Deutscher Fußball-Verband der DDR did not impose a ban on women's football, however, early attempts to set up teams were met with obstruction from officials. In 1969, the Socialist Unity Party of Germany decreed that only men's football was eligible for funding as an elite sport. The East Germany women's national football team would only ever play a single match, in May 1990.

Nigeria 

Following the start of a period of sustained growth of women's football in Nigeria in the early 1940s, during which a number of teams were founded, the British colonial administration banned the sport in 1950, citing the 1921 ban in England as precedent. However, the ban was met with resistance, with a number of teams continuing to play, and ultimately came to an end with Nigerian independence in October 1960.

Norway 

In 1931, IF Fløya applied to the Norwegian Football Federation to start a women's team, but was banned by the Federation from establishing the team, with the Federation saying that the "football was for men only, and clubs should not let women play on their pitches, and referees should not referee women matches." It would take until the late-1960s for independent women's teams to be established, particularly with the leadership of Målfrid Kuvås, and until 1978 for the Federation to establish the Norway women's national football team.

Soviet Union 

In 1972, following complaints of a women's tournament held in Dnipropetrovsk, the Soviet Federation of Sports Medicine published a statement warning against women's participation in football, saying that it posed a health risk. The State Committee for Physical Culture and Sport subsequently announced a ban on women's football. The ban would last until the Gorbachev era, with the Soviet Union women's national football team playing its first match in early 1990.

Spain 

A number of women's football teams had been formed in Spain during the Second Spanish Republic. However, under the far-right Francoist dictatorship that began in parts of the country with the Spanish coup of July 1936 and over the entire country in 1939, women's football was banned. Luis Agostí, an advisor to the Sección Femenina de Falange, stated that women should not "participate in sports like men, but rather to do so in accordance with their own forms of expression," as sports like football "demanded qualities that were diametrically opposed to those of women’s bodily constitution." As the dictatorship began its decline in the late-1960s, women's football began to see a return, with several unofficial matches being organised. The government attempted to repress the sport, with the Sección Femenina ordering its members in 1971 to "abstain from promoting any activities related to women’s football," with doctors distributing disinformation about the impact of the game on fertility, and with the government refusing to allow the Federation of Independent European Female Football to host the successor to the 1971 Women's World Cup in 1972, leading to the cancellation of the tournament. Following the Spanish transition to democracy in the late-1970s, the ban came to an end, and the Spain women's national football team was officially formed in 1980.

United Kingdom 

During the 1910s, women's football in the UK saw a significant surge in growth which would continue past the end of World War I and into the 1920s. During this period, women's matches often attracted thousands of spectators, with the top teams, such as Dick, Kerr Ladies F.C., attracting audiences in the tens of thousands. Many of these matches were played for charity, often raising thousands of pounds, and the game was growing to the point where interest rivaled that of men's games.

However, The Football Association viewed the growth and success of women's football with distrust and increasingly saw it as a rival competitor to men's profits, particularly as the FA had announced a significant expansion of the men's English Football League in 1920. As well, the FA had little control over the finances of women's matches and was opposed to the charity matches that had been played in support of workers taking strike actions, such as during the Miners' Federation of Great Britain lockout. As a result, on 5 December 1921, the FA imposed a ban on women's football, stating that "the game of football is quite unsuitable for females and should not be encouraged" and alleging that "an excessive proportion of the receipts are absorbed in expenses and an inadequate percentage devoted to charitable objects." When women's teams attempted to continue to organise matches on non-football grounds, such as on cricket or rugby grounds, the FA further pressured the organisations in charge of those grounds to deny women permission. The English was also endorsed by several football associations elsewhere in the British Empire, such as the Queensland Football Association and the Dominion of Canada Football Association.

In 1969, the Women's Football Association was formed with representatives of over 40 different independent clubs. In 1971, the FA announced that the ban on women's football would be lifted. The WFA would formally affiliate itself to the FA in 1983, and in 1993, the FA took over direct responsibility for women's football. In 2008, the FA issued a formal apology for the ban.

In 1902, the Scottish Football Association (SFA) implemented a rule restricting men's teams from playing charity matches against women's teams, following the lead of the English Football Association, which had recommended its teams against participating in such matches. In 1921, the SFA followed the English FA once more in implementing a total ban on women's football. In late-1971, when UEFA proposed requiring its member associations to formally incorporate women's football, the SFA was the only member association to vote against the proposal.

In March 1922, following complaints from religious congregations, the Football Association of Wales also implemented a total ban. However, the ban was initially less comprehensive and less consistently applied than in England, with the Marquis of Bute authorising Dick, Kerr Ladies F.C. to hold a charity match against Olympic de Paris just three weeks after the FAW announced the ban. The match, held at Cardiff Arms Park, attracted an audience of 15,000 and raised funds for the restoration of Reims Cathedral. In 1939, the FAW instituted a stronger version of the ban, decreeing that "no football match in which any lady or ladies take part in any way whatsoever shall be permitted to be played on any football ground within the jurisdiction of this Association. Clubs, officials, players or referees are not permitted to associate themselves in any way whatsoever with Ladies Football matches." The ban was lifted on 29 May 1970.

Impact 
The banning of women's football is believed to have severely stunted the growth of the sport, in some countries effectively killing the sport entirely for decades, and to have forced the sport to effectively restart from zero in the late-20th century. Writer David Goldblatt has stated that the bans had the effect of reducing women's football "to a tiny and stigmatised subculture subsisting in the marginal spaces of municipal recreation grounds." Furthermore, even after the bans were lifted, the levels of investment into the sport have often been significantly lower than they had been prior to the bans. As the sport had grow during its first golden age to the point where matches attracted similar audiences to men's games, the bans have been cited as a major factor in the gap in popularity between the sport and its male counterparts.

Simon Kuper and economist Stefan Szymanski, authors of Soccernomics, have argued that the bans on women's football would today represent violations of competition law and that the associations that imposed bans should be retrospectively fined damages, with the money being used to invest into the women's game. Kuper and Szymanski further added that women's football wasn't just "some potential untapped market, but a business sector that was regularly selling tens of thousands of match tickets. These revenues would surely have grown over time, as men’s revenues did." The record attendance attendance for a women's football domestic match set by Dick, Kerr Ladies F.C. and St. Helen's Ladies F.C. in December 1920, with in 53 000 attendance at Goodison Park and an extra 15 000 waiting outside of the grounds, would last until 2019, when a Primera División match between Atlético Madrid Femenino and FC Barcelona Femení at the Metropolitano Stadium saw attendance of 60 739.

Belinda Scarlett of the National Football Museum has stated that the bans "perpetuated the myth that football is not a women's game, which is something women still fight for today," adding that women's football still has to struggle "for pitch space, for financial support, for media coverage." Research by Stacey Pope of Durham University has found that many of the same attitudes that men used to justify bans of women's football in the 1920s are still widespread today. A 2020 paper by Lisa Jenkel of the University of Groningen that press coverage of bans of women's football in the 1920s portrayed the sport as a threat to the "natural, biological order of the sexes" and on the "compatibility of women’s football and contemporary gender norms." Jenkel further found that in contemporary social media discourse around women's football, "sexualisation of players and spectators, dismissing women’s matches as ‘unwatchable’ or disputing the game being a sport, are seemingly still part of some mindsets."

See also
Dick, Kerr Ladies 4–0 St Helens Ladies

References 

Women's association football